The 1928 San Francisco Seals season was the 26th season in the history of the San Francisco Seals baseball team. The 1926 team won the Pacific Coast League (PCL) pennant with a 120–71 record. Nick Williams was the team's manager. In the 1928 PCL championship series, the Seals defeated the Sacramento Solons four games to two.

The 1925 Seals were selected in 2003 by a panel of minor league experts as the ninth best team in the PCL's 100-year history. The team was also selected by Minor League Baseball as the 50th best team in minor league history. According to one published account, the Seals in 1928 were "considered the second most valuable franchise in sports, second only to the New York Yankees."

The team's outfield trio of Smead Jolley, Earl Averill, and Roy Johnson, rated by some as the best minor league outfield in history, combined for 813 hits, 103 home runs, and 437 RBIs. Right fielder Jolley won the PCL's Triple Crown, leading the league with a .404 batting average, 45 home runs, 188 RBIs, 309 hits, and 516 total bases. Center fielder Averill, a Baseball Hall of Fame inductee, led the league with 178 runs and finished second behind Jolly with 173 RBIs. Left fielder Johnson hit .360 and led the PCL with 16 triples.  After the 1928 season, the Seals sold the three outfielders for a total of $135,000.

Though remembered mostly for their offensive output and .308 team batting average, the 1928 Seals also had a strong pitching staff.  Dutch Ruether, a native of Alameda, California, led the PCL with 29 wins and 28 complete games. Elmer Jacobs won 22 games, had a streak of 35 scoreless innings, and led the league with 159 strikeouts and a 2.56 earned run average. Duster Mails, a native of San Quentin, California, won 20 games and struck out 152 batters.

1928 PCL standings

Players

Batting 
Note: Pos = Position; G = Games played; AB = At bats; H = Hits; Avg. = Batting average; HR = Home runs; RBI = Runs batted in

Pitching 
Note: G = Games pitched; IP = Innings pitched; W = Wins; L = Losses; PCT = Win percentage; ERA = Earned run average

References

Further reading
 "The Greatest Minor League: A History of the Pacific Coast League, 1903-1957", by Dennis Snelling (McFarland 2011)
 "San Francisco Seals", by Martin Jacobs & Jack McGuire (Arcadia Publishing 2005)

1928 in sports in California
Pacific Coast League seasons